Breakwater may refer to:

 Breakwater (structure), a structure for protecting a beach or harbour

Places
 Breakwater, Victoria, a suburb of Geelong, Victoria, Australia
 Breakwater Island, Antarctica
 Breakwater Islands, Nunavut, Canada
 Breakwater School, a Portland, Maine, pre-school and elementary school founded in 1956

Arts and entertainment
 Breakwater (band), a funk and soul band from the 1970s
 Breakwater (album), a 1988 album by Lennie Gallant
 The Breakwater, an alternative name for the 1670 painting Storm Off a Sea Coast by Jacob van Ruisdael

Other
 , a United States Navy patrol vessel, minesweeper, and tug in commission from 1917 to 1920
 Breaking the water or water breaking, a term for the rupture of membranes during pregnancy